Paul Newlove (born 10 August 1971) is an English former professional rugby league footballer who played in the 1980s, 1990s and 2000s. He played for St Helens (Heritage № 1064) during a successful eight-year period with the club. Newlove was a Great Britain international. Newlove also represented England at the 1995 Rugby League World Cup. He now works in Wakefield at Trinity Academy Cathedral.

Background
Newlove was born in Pontefract, West Riding of Yorkshire, England.

Playing career

1980s
Paul Newlove made his début for Featherstone Rovers on Tuesday 27 September 1988, he later played left- in Featherstone Rovers' 14-20 defeat by Bradford Northern in the 1989 Yorkshire Cup Final during the 1989–90 season at Headingley, Leeds on Sunday 5 November 1989. He moved on to play for Bradford Northern five years later. He won caps for Great Britain while at Featherstone Rovers in 1989 against New Zealand (sub), and New Zealand (2 matches). Newlove won a cap for Yorkshire while at Featherstone Rovers; during the 1989–90 season against Lancashire.

1990s
Newlove represented Great Britain in 1991 and in 1992 against Papua New Guinea (sub); he was selected to go on the 1992 Great Britain Lions tour of Australia and New Zealand playing three matches against Australia and one against New Zealand; in 1993 against France. Newlove also won caps for England while at Featherstone Rovers in 1992 against Wales. Newlove played left- and scored two tries in Featherstone Rovers' 20–16 victory over Workington Town in the 1992–93 Divisional Premiership Final at Old Trafford, Manchester on 19 May 1993. Newlove scored a total of 48 tries during the season – a club record.

Bradford Northern paid £245,000 for Paul Newlove when he moved from Featherstone Rovers in 1993 (based on increases in average earnings, this would be approximately £486,900 in 2013). The transfer of Paul Newlove to St. Helens from the Bradford Bulls is still one of the most expensive rugby league transfers. 
He played for Great Britain while at Bradford Northern in 1993 against New Zealand (3 matches), in 1994 against France, Australia, and Australia (sub), while at St. Helens in 1997 against Australia (SL) (3 matches), and in 1998 against New Zealand. He played for England while at Bradford Northern in 1995 against Wales, Australia (2 matches), Fiji, and Wales.

Newlove was selected to play for England in the 1995 World Cup Final at centre, scoring a try in the loss against Australia.

St. Helens on 29 November 1995 paid Bradford Northern £250,000 cash (based on increases in average earnings, this would be approximately £464,900 in 2013), and also sent Sonny Nickle, Bernard Dwyer and Paul Loughlin to Bradford Northern. He played for England while at St. Helens in 1996 against France.
Newlove played for St Helens at centre in their 1996 Challenge Cup Final victory over Bradford Bulls.
At the end of Super League's first season, Newlove was the season's top try scorer and was named at centre in the 1996 Super League Dream Team. In the 1997 post season, Newlove was selected to play for Great Britain at centre in all three matches of the Super League Test series against Australia. Newlove played for St. Helens at centre in their 1999 Super League Grand Final victory over Bradford Bulls.

Paul Newlove played left- and scored a try in St. Helens' 16-25 defeat by Wigan in the 1995–96 Regal Trophy Final during the 1995–96 at Alfred McAlpine Stadium, Huddersfield on Saturday 13 January 1996.

2000s
Having won the 1999 Championship St. Helens contested in the 2000 World Club Challenge against National Rugby League Premiers the Melbourne Storm, with Newlove playing at centre in the loss. Newlove was not selected for England at the 2000 Rugby League World Cup. As Super League V champions, St. Helens played against 2000 NRL Premiers, the Brisbane Broncos in the 2001 World Club Challenge. Newlove played at centre in Saints' victory. He also represented Yorkshire in the Origin Series. Newlove had spent nine seasons at St. Helens, lifting many trophies throughout a successful Knowsley Road career. Newlove played for St. Helens at centre in their 2002 Super League Grand Final victory against the Bradford Bulls. He joined Castleford Tigers (Heritage № 808) in 2003 for one final season before retirement.

Post-play
Newlove currently works as a Student Liaison Officer at Trinity Academy Cathedral in Wakefield, and has done so since 2005.

Honoured at Featherstone Rovers
Paul Newlove is a Featherstone Rovers Hall of Fame inductee.

Genealogical information
Paul Newlove is the middle son of the rugby league footballer John Newlove, and he is the younger brother of the rugby league footballer who played in the 1980s and 1990s for Featherstone Rovers; Shaun Newlove, and the older brother of the rugby league footballer; Richard Newlove,

References

External links
(archived by web.archive.org) RL Hall of Fame
Saints Heritage Society
Newlove quits international arena
Newlove's exit is no surprise
Injured Newlove retires
(archived by web.archive.org) The Millennium Masters – Backs

1971 births
Living people
Bradford Bulls players
Castleford Tigers players
England national rugby league team players
English rugby league players
Featherstone Rovers players
Great Britain national rugby league team players
Rugby league centres
Rugby league players from Pontefract
Rugby league props
Rugby league wingers
St Helens R.F.C. players
Yorkshire rugby league team players